"Bump Bump!" is BoA's twenty-eighth Japanese single. It was produced by Verbal from M-Flo, who wrote both songs and featured as a rapper on both tracks. The single was released on October 28, 2009.

Track list

CD
 Bump Bump! feat. Verbal (4:05)
 IZM feat. Verbal (4:36)
 Bump Bump! feat. Verbal (Instrumental) (4:03)
 IZM feat. Verbal (Instrumental) (4:30)

DVD
 Bump Bump! feat. Verbal(M-Flo) Music Video 
 Bump Bump! feat. Verbal(M-Flo) Music Video: Dance Edit (First Press CD+DVD Edition Only)

Live performances
 10/25 - Gekkan Melodix!
 10/27 - Gekkou Ongaku Dan
 10/30 - Music Station
 10/31 - Music Fighter
 10/31 - Music Japan

Charts
Oricon Sales Chart (Japan)

References

2009 singles
BoA songs
Songs written by Verbal (rapper)
2009 songs
Avex Trax singles